Marconi Stallions Football Club is an Australian semi-professional soccer club based in Fairfield, Sydney, New South Wales. The club has been crowned Australian champion four times.

The Stallions are the soccer team of Club Marconi, a social and sporting club founded in 1958 by immigrants from Italy who settled in Sydney's western suburbs. It earned promotion to the top tier of soccer in New South Wales and established itself as one of the strongest clubs in Sydney during the 1970s, before becoming a founding member of the National Soccer League in 1977. Marconi was, along with South Melbourne, one of just two clubs to compete in all 27 seasons of the now-defunct National Soccer League. The club won its first national title in 1979 but the Stallions' heyday came in the late 1980s and early 1990s, when they won a further three NSL titles across six seasons, twice also finishing on top of the ladder as minor premiers.

Marconi has produced at least six former captains of the Australia national soccer team, while former Italy national football team striker Christian Vieri came through its junior ranks while his father Roberto lived and played in Sydney. Other Marconi youth products include former Australian winger Harry Kewell, veteran national team goalkeeper Mark Schwarzer, current Real Sociedad and former Brighton and Hove Albion goalkeeper Matt Ryan, ex-Lazio and Fiorentina midfielder Paul Okon, and former Bari striker Frank Farina, who went on to coach the Australia national soccer team.

Marconi currently competes in the National Premier Leagues NSW; the second tier of the game in Australia. Its home games are played at the 9000-capacity Marconi Stadium in the suburb of Bossley Park in Sydney's west; a venue known affectionately by players and fans as the Palace. Over the years, the club has been known as Club Marconi, Marconi-Datsun Leopards, Marconi-Fairfield and Marconi Stallions.

Throughout the club's history, it has been an institution of the Italian community in Sydney, and its playing colours have varied between a light blue azzurro strip in homage to the Italy national football team and a combination of green shirt, white shorts, red socks: the colours of the Italian flag.

History

Foundation and early years (1956-1976)
Club Marconi was founded as a bocce club in 1956 by 106 members of the Italian community in the western suburbs of Sydney. It is named after the Italian inventor and electrical engineer Guglielmo Marconi, whose wireless company sent the first direct radio message from Great Britain to Australia. It was inaugural president Oscar Michelini who first suggested the name Marconi at the second meeting of the club's provisional committee. A statue of Guglielmo Marconi was donated by the Italian government in 1959 and it remains inside the main foyer of the club, inscribed with the message “Guglielmo Marconi, 1874 – 1937, immortal genius of the Italian nation who first with science’s wonders and spiritual wings linked Australia with the world.”

Italo-Australian artist Guido Zuliani, born in 1927, designed Club Marconi's emblem, which remains in use by the social club today. It incorporates a globe, a boomerang to symbolise Indigenous Australian culture, with the colours of green, white and red to represent the Italian heritage. The emblem is encased by Marconi’s invention of wireless communication, further portrayed as a radio tower. The club's home base in Bossley Park, next to where Marconi Stadium now stands, was offered for $6900 by the brothers Ruben and Provino Sartor, two inaugural members who had visited the Yoogali Club in the rural town of Griffith, New South Wales to learn how the Italian community there had founded their own social organisation.

The soccer club first appeared in 1958 as a youth team, and the first senior side competed in the 1961 NSW amateur championship that it won by 8 points.

The club gradually moved up the ranks in the NSW soccer system, eventually gaining promotion to the NSW 1st Division in 1970. By this point the club had come of age. Marconi became back-to-back champions of the NSW 1st Division in 1972 and 1973, and continued to challenge for honours up until 1976. The next year, 1977, Marconi and 13 other clubs formed the first ever truly national sports competition in Australia, the National Soccer League.

National Soccer League (1977–2004)
In its first season in the NSL in 1977, Marconi finished second on goal difference to Eastern Suburbs (Sydney City). In 1979, Marconi was Australian champions. The club won the NSL Cup in 1980.

Ahead of the 1981 National Soccer League season, Marconi signed a sponsorship deal with car manufacturer Datsun under which the club were known as Marconi-Datsun Leopards.

What is generally described as the club's "golden era" started in the late 1980s, when some of the finest players in Australia made their way to what was then known as "the Palace". The club made three consecutive Grand Final appearances in 1988, 1989 and 1989–90, winning the 1988 and 1989 Grand Finals, but lost the 1989–90 decider. Marconi were also minor premiers in 1989 and 1989–90, and won the 1992–93 Grand Final.

In 1995–96 under former Socceroo Manfred Schaefer, Marconi won another Minor Premiership, finishing one point ahead of Melbourne Knights and Sydney Olympic. In the finals series, Marconi made it to yet another Grand Final, this time going down 2–1 to Melbourne Knights at Olympic Park in Melbourne.

Marconi made the finals for the next five years in a row, before experiencing two poor seasons. In 2003–04, the final NSL season, Marconi again made the Finals, but the 1995–96 minor premiership ended up being the final trophy win during the club's time in the NSL.

NSW Premier League/National Premier Leagues NSW 1 (2004–2015)
After the 2003–04 NSL season the competition was ceased. Marconi entered the NSW Premier League for the 2004–05 season. Between 2004 and 2011 in the NSW Premier League the club had mixed results, with their best season in 2009 when they finished second.

In 2012 the club rebounded and the Marconi Stallions were the Champions of the NSW Premier League. After a third placed league finish, Marconi beat Sydney Olympic 2–0 in the Qualifying Final, then lost to Bonnyrigg White Eagles FC 2–0 in the Major Semi-Final. In the Preliminary Final they faced Blacktown City Demons who led 2–1 at half time, but Marconi scored 3 unanswered goals in the second half to win 4–2. In the Grand Final, they came up against the minor premiers and favourites Bonnyrigg at their ground. Bonnyrigg had won the league by 15 points and had already beaten Marconi in the finals series, but Marconi won the Championship with two second half goals to win 2–0.

In late 2013 the Marconi Stallions were accepted into the newly formed National Premier Leagues NSW. The NPL NSW replaced the previous NSW Premier League. In their first season in the NPL NSW in 2014, Marconi finished in 8th place in the 12-team division.

Relegation and Promotion (2015–2017)
Marconi was relegated to the NPL NSW 2 on 16 August 2015, after enduring the worst season in its history. The Stallions earned just seven points all season and, after a mass player exodus, ended the season with ten consecutive defeats.

The Stallions began their rebuilding campaign in October 2015 with the aim of getting straight back in the top state division. They signed former A-League players Sean Rooney, Mirjan Pavlović and Marko Ješić. Marconi qualified for the 2016 FFA Cup and drew Victorian side Hume City in the Round of 32. Marconi sacked head coach Jeff Suzor in mid-July 2016. Marconi were defeated by Hume City despite taking the lead in the first half of extra time, as Hume managed a 117th-minute equaliser and then won the clash on penalties. Marconi finished the NPL 2 season in 4th place, failing to achieve its target of promotion, despite Rooney, Pavlovic and Jesic scoring 51 goals between them.

In September 2017, Marconi won the NPL NSW 2 Grand Final, having already won the premiership by 18 points, and returned to the New South Wales top flight. Sean Rooney won the league golden boot with 27 goals. In January 2018 Marconi signed AFC Champions League-winning midfielder Mateo Poljak. The Stallions finished in 6th place in its first season back in the top-flight.

Marconi won the 2019 Waratah Cup, defeating Sydney United 58 FC 2-1.

Current squad

First-team

 

Source:

Rivalries

Sydney Olympic

Marconi vs Sydney Olympic has always been one of the biggest rivalries in Australian soccer, constantly involved in big and important matches multiplied by the fact that both clubs were backed by large migrant populations of Italians (Marconi) and Greeks (Olympic).

Sydney United 58

Marconi has a rivalry with Sydney United due to the close proximity of the two clubs. Sydney United is located in Edensor Park and play out of King Tomislav Club which is only 1 km south of Club Marconi. The Croatian club have been rivals of the Stallions since 1971 when Marconi were promoted to the State League.

APIA Leichhardt

The Stallions and APIA have a friendly rivalry. These two clubs are the two Italian backed clubs in New South Wales. The two clubs compete every season in the Italian Derby.

Seasons

Key
Key to league competitions:

 NSL – Australia's top league, beginning in 1977 before folding in 2004.
 NSW Premier League or NPL NSW 1 – NSW Regional top league.
 NPL NSW 2 – NSW Regional second division.

Key to colours and symbols:

Key to league record:
 Season = The year and article of the season
 Pos = Final position
 Pld = Games played
 W = Games won
 D = Games drawn
 L = Games lost
 GF = Goals scored
 GA = Goals against
 Pts = Points

Key to cup record:
 En-dash (—) = Did not qualify
 GS  = Group stage
 1R, 2R...7R = 1st Round, 2nd Round...7th Round
 R32 = Round of 32
 R16 = Round of 16
 QF  = Quarter-finals
 SF  = Semi-finals
 RU  = Runners-up
 W   = Winners

Seasons

Honours

National Soccer League 
 NSL Premiership
Minor Premiers (3) – 1989, 1989–90, 1995–96
 NSL Championship
Champions (4) – 1979, 1988, 1989, 1992–93
 NSL Cup
Winners (1) – 1980

National Premier Leagues 
National Premier Leagues NSW Championship
Champions (3): 1972, 1973, 2012
National Premier Leagues NSW 2 Premiership
Premiers (1): 2017
National Premier Leagues NSW 2 Championship
Champions (1): 2017

Academy 
National Youth League Championship
Champions (2): 1988, 1995–96

Individual 
 Brad Maloney won the Johnny Warren Medal while playing for Marconi in the 1998–99 NSL season.

Divisional history

By seasons

By tier

References

 Alex elyassih was goalkeeper from 1987 to 1988.

External links
 Club official website
 [CC-By-SA]. Origins of Italian social club which founded soccer club.

 
Association football clubs established in 1958
National Soccer League (Australia) teams
New South Wales Premier League teams
National Premier Leagues clubs
1958 establishments in Australia
Italian-Australian backed sports clubs of New South Wales